"Machinehead" is a song by English rock band Bush, released on 9 April 1996 as the fifth and final single from their 1994 debut album, Sixteen Stone.

Music video
The music video was directed by Shawn Mortensen in London and Portsmouth. Sections of Shepherd's Bush, where the band members used to live, can be seen in the video. Gavin Rossdale's dog Winston is also in the video.

Commercial performance
"Machinehead" reached No. 43 on the Billboard Hot 100 on 4 May 1996. It reached No. 4 on both the Billboard Modern Rock Tracks and Mainstream Rock Tracks charts. The song was nominated for Best Video from a Film at the 1996 MTV Music Video Awards but lost; however, it did win the MTV Movie Award for Best Song from a Movie at the 1996 MTV Movie Awards.

Track listing
US CD Single IND95505
"Machinehead" - 4:20
"Comedown [Acoustic]" - 4:24
"X-Girlfriend" - 0:44
UK CD Limited Edition Single (Numbered Metal Insert - 7500 Made) INDX95505
"Machinehead"
"Bud"
"Solomon's Bones"
UK 10" Vinyl (Numbered) INV95505
"Machinehead"
"Comedown [Acoustic]"
"Solomon's Bones"

Appearances in the media
It is played at the beginning of every Columbus Blue Jackets hockey game before the opening faceoff.
Wrestler Jim Steele used this song as an entrance theme in All Japan Pro Wrestling.
The song is featured in the video games Guitar Hero: Warriors of Rock, Madden NFL 11, Saints Row: The Third, Rock Band 3 and Rocksmith 2014.
The song was featured on Cold Case in the episode "The Plan".
The song was used as the theme song to Paul Finebaum's radio show.
The song is one of two Bush songs that were featured in the film Fear, the other being "Comedown".
A production version of the song created by Metro Music and titled "Burning Tree" is featured as a theme for the WWE, most often associated with the Insurrextion event
The song also features in the film Fear Street Part One: 1994.

Chart positions

References

External links

1994 songs
1996 singles
Bush (British band) songs
Songs written by Gavin Rossdale
Grunge songs
Song recordings produced by Clive Langer
Song recordings produced by Alan Winstanley
Interscope Records singles
Trauma Records singles